Joseph Ames may refer to:

Joseph Ames (author) (1689–1759), English author
Joseph Ames (naval commander) (1619–1695), English naval commander
Joseph Alexander Ames (1816–1872), American painter
Joseph Bushnell Ames (1878–1928), American novelist
Joseph Sweetman Ames (1864–1943), American physicist
Ames Brothers member, Joe Ames